Gaoussou Koné (born 28 April 1944) is a former sprinter from Côte d'Ivoire, who represented his native West African country at three consecutive Summer Olympics: 1964, 1968 and 1972. He is best known for winning two gold medals (100 and 200 metres) at the 1965 All-Africa Games.

Personal bests
100 metres – 10.21 (1967)
200 metres – 21.1 (1965)

References

1944 births
Living people
Ivorian male sprinters
Athletes (track and field) at the 1964 Summer Olympics
Athletes (track and field) at the 1968 Summer Olympics
Athletes (track and field) at the 1972 Summer Olympics
Olympic athletes of Ivory Coast
African Games gold medalists for Ivory Coast
African Games medalists in athletics (track and field)
Universiade medalists in athletics (track and field)
Athletes (track and field) at the 1965 All-Africa Games
Universiade medalists for Ivory Coast
Medalists at the 1967 Summer Universiade